The 2012 Superettan, part of the 2012 Swedish football season, was the 12th season of Sweden's second-tier football league in its current format. The 2012 fixtures were released on 9 December 2011. The season began on 6 April 2012 and ended on 3 November 2012.

Teams 
A total of 16 teams contested the league, 12 returning from the 2011 season, two relegated from Allsvenskan and two promoted from Division 1. The top two teams qualified directly for promotion to Allsvenskan, the third had to play a play-off against the fourteenth from Allsvenskan to decide who will play in Allsvenskan 2013. The bottom two teams qualified directly for relegation to Division 1, the thirteenth and the fourteenth had to play a play-off against the numbers two from Division 1 Södra and Division 1 Norra to decide who will play in Superettan 2013.

2011-champions Åtvidabergs FF and runner-up GIF Sundsvall were promoted to the Allsvenskan at the end of the 2011 season. They were replaced by Halmstads BK and Trelleborgs FF. Västerås SK and Qviding FIF were relegated at the end of the 2011 season after finishing in the bottom two places of the table. They were replaced by Division 1 Norra champions Umeå FC and Division 1 Södra champions Varbergs BoIS.

Stadia and locations

 1 Correct as of end of 2012 season

Personnel and kits

Note: Flags indicate national team as has been defined under FIFA eligibility rules. Players and Managers may hold more than one non-FIFA nationality.

Managerial changes

League table

Relegation play-offs

Positions by round

Note: Some matches were played out of phase with the corresponding round, positions were corrected in hindsight.

Results

Season statistics

Top goalkeepers

(Minimum of 10 games played)

Hat-tricks

 4 Player scored 4 goals

Attendance

See also 

Competitions
 2012 Allsvenskan
 2012 Division 1
 2012 Supercupen

Team seasons
 2012 Halmstads BK season

Transfers
 List of Swedish football transfers winter 2011–2012
 List of Swedish football transfers summer 2012

References

External links

 Official website 

Superettan seasons
2
Sweden
Sweden